George Anthony Thomas Weldon (5 June 1908, in Chichester, England – 17 August 1963, in South Africa) was an English conductor.

Biography
Weldon was the son of Major F H Weldon of the Sherwood Foresters. He was educated at Sherborne School and the Royal College of Music. He studied conducting with Malcolm Sargent and Aylmer Buesst. In 1943, at 36 years of age, he became the conductor of the City of Birmingham Orchestra in succession to Leslie Heward. He was dismissed in 1950, following unsubstantiated rumours that he was having an affair with Ruth Gipps, choirmaster of the Birmingham orchestra's chorus. It was announced that Weldon would be replaced by Rudolf Schwarz; according to Gipps, Weldon resigned before he could be dismissed.

In 1952 Weldon became assistant to Sir John Barbirolli at the Hallé Orchestra and remained in that position until his death. In 1955 and 1956 he also conducted the Sadler's Wells Ballet. He became well known for his love of sports cars. While in Manchester, Weldon took charge of the Hallé summer seasons of promenade concerts, and many industrial concerts around the north of England. He frequently conducted in London and abroad, made broadcasts and many records.

Recordings
Weldon made a series of recordings for EMI. His stereophonic recording of Tchaikovsky's The Sleeping Beauty with the Philharmonia Orchestra has been reissued on CD.  Numerous other recordings by Weldon were also available on CD as of 2008.

Notes

References

External links
George Weldon – A Life of Music and Very Fast Cars (2007)- Margery Law & Jean Powrie
 Portrait of George Weldon by Juliet Pannett (1956), Royal Academy of Music
 Royal Tunbridge Wells Choral Society archive. 1942-3

1908 births
1963 deaths
English conductors (music)
British male conductors (music)
People from Chichester
People educated at Sherborne School
Alumni of the Royal College of Music
20th-century English musicians
20th-century British conductors (music)
20th-century British male musicians